El Piveto Mountain  is a mountain located between Wolf River and Cervus Creek on Vancouver Island, British Columbia,  southeast of Rambler Peak and  east of Gold River.


History
The first ascent of El Piveto Mountain was completed in 1966 by Mike Walsh, Pat and Elizabeth Guilbride, Bob Tustin, Ray Paine, Syd Watts and John and Doreen Cowlin.

References

Sources

Piveto
Vancouver Island Ranges
Nootka Land District